Gisbert Johann Eduard Kapp (2 September 1852, Mauer, Vienna – 10 August 1922, Birmingham) was an Austrian-English electrical engineer.

His parents were an Austrian counselor Gisbert Kapp and Luisa Kapp-Young. After finishing his studies in Austria, Kapp moved to England where he was naturalized in 1881. He was awarded a Telford Medal in 1885/6. In 1904 he was offered the position as the first Chair of Electrical Engineering at the University of Birmingham, a post he held until 1919. In 1909 he was elected the president of the Institution of Electrical Engineers.

Kapp developed the basis for the calculation and construction of alternating current, dynamos and the transformer. The Electronic, Electrical & Systems Engineering Department at the University of Birmingham is situated in a building named after him.

References

1852 births
1922 deaths
British electrical engineers
British people of Austrian descent
People from Liesing